Nick Papadakis (born 6 March 1943) is a former professional soccer player who played in the North American Soccer League. Born in Greece, he earned four caps for the Canadian national side. He is the current CEO of the USL First Division.

Playing career 
Papadakis attended Hartwick College where he is the all-time points leader He was a 1963 and 1966 Honorable Mention (third team) All American. In 1995, he was inducted into the Hartwick Hawks Hall of Fame. In 1968, he signed with the Atlanta Chiefs of the North American Soccer League. In 1973, new ownership renamed the team the Atlanta Apollos. He finished his professional career with the Tampa Bay Rowdies in 1975.

Papadakis earned four caps for the Canada national team in 1968, scoring two goals.

Administrative career 
In August 2009, NuRock Soccer Holdings, co-owned by Alec Papadakis and Rob Hoskins, purchased the USL First Division. The group installed Nick Papadakis as league commercial director.

References

External links 
 
 NASL career stats

1943 births
Living people
Atlanta Chiefs players
Canadian expatriate sportspeople in the United States
Canadian expatriate soccer players
Canada men's international soccer players
Canadian soccer players
Canadian soccer chairmen and investors
Expatriate soccer players in the United States
Association football forwards
Greek emigrants to Canada
Hartwick Hawks men's soccer players
Naturalized citizens of Canada
North American Soccer League (1968–1984) players
North American Soccer League (1968–1984) indoor players
Tampa Bay Rowdies (1975–1993) players
Footballers from Athens
Greek footballers